Jerbanlu (also Romanized as Jerbānlū and Jerbanloo; also known as Jerbān, Jeryānlū, and Jīrbānlū) is a village in Kharqan Rural District, in the Central District of Razan County, Hamadan Province, Iran. At the 2006 census, its population was 514, in 125 families.

References 

Populated places in Razan County